The  is a limited express electric multiple unit (EMU) train type operated by Kintetsu Railway in Japan since 19 June 2010.

Operations
They are operated on the Minami Osaka and Yoshino Lines, replacing the earlier  trains.

Design
The design is based on the Kintetsu 22600 series trains used on the standard gauge Osaka and Nara Lines since 2009.

Formation
, two two-car sets are in operation, formed as follows, with one motored ("Mc") car and one non-powered trailer ("Tc") car.

Car 2 has two single-arm pantographs.

Interior
Car 1 has a wheelchair space and toilet. Car 2 has a smoking compartment.

History
Two two-car sets were built at a cost of approximately 800 million yen. Test running commenced in May 2010, with entry into revenue service from 19 June 2010.

References

External links

 Kintetsu website 

Electric multiple units of Japan
16600 series
Train-related introductions in 2010

ja:近鉄22600系電車#16600系
1500 V DC multiple units of Japan
Kinki Sharyo multiple units